OTO Award TV Male Actor

Currently held by  Michal Hudák

First awarded  | Last awarded 2000 | Present 

OTO Award for TV Male Actor has been bestowed to the most recognized male actors of the past year in Slovakia since 2000. Between the years 2010 and 2011, the accolade was given in two acting categories, depending on a genre such as Drama and Comedy. Since 2012, the general category is held.

Winners and nominees

2000s

2010s

Superlatives

 Notes
┼ Denotes also a winner in two or more of the main categories. † Denotes also a winner of the Absolute OTO category. ‡ Denotes also an inductee into the Hall of Fame OTO.

Associated categories
OTO Award TV Male Actor – Drama

First awarded  | Last awarded 2010 | 2011

TV Male Actor – Drama

 2 awards
 Ján Koleník

 2 nominations
 Ján Koleník
 Janko Kroner

OTO Award TV Male Actor – Comedy

First awarded  | Last awarded 2010 | 2011

TV Male Actor – Comedy

 2 awards
 Lukáš Latinák

 2 nominations
 Lukáš Latinák
 Ľuboš Kostelný

References

External links
 OTO Awards (Official website)
 OTO Awards - Winners and nominees (From 2000 onwards)
 OTO Awards - Winners and nominees (From 2000 to 2009)

Actor, male
Slovak culture
Slovak television awards
Awards established in 2000